Marion D. Reed (born 6 March 1860) was an American politician and Congregationalist minister.

Reed was born on 6 March 1860 and raised in Guernsey, Ohio, until the age of sixteen. He was then educated in the common schools of Corydon, Iowa. Upon graduating, Reed became a schoolteacher. Subsequently, he operated a granary and a general store for four years. After divesting from his business interests, Reed studied theology at Oberlin College. Reed began his career as a Congregationalist minister in 1890, when he returned to Iowa and served as a missionary in Ida and Sac Counties. Reed relocated to Exira in 1893. Shortly thereafter, he was elected to the Iowa House of Representatives as a Republican legislator from District 34, which he served until 1896.

References

Schoolteachers from Iowa
People from Guernsey County, Ohio
People from Audubon County, Iowa
19th-century American merchants
1860 births
Year of death missing
19th-century American Congregationalist ministers
19th-century American educators
Oberlin College alumni
People from Corydon, Iowa
19th-century American politicians